The Office of Communications, commonly known as Ofcom, is the government-approved regulatory and competition authority for the broadcasting, telecommunications and postal industries of the United Kingdom.

Ofcom has wide-ranging powers across the television, radio, telecoms and postal sectors. It has a statutory duty to represent the interests of citizens and consumers by promoting competition and protecting the public from harmful or offensive material.

Some of the main areas Ofcom regulates are TV and radio standards, broadband and phones, video-sharing platforms online, the wireless spectrum and postal services.

The regulator was initially established by the Office of Communications Act 2002 and received its full authority from the Communications Act 2003.

History
On , the Queen's Speech to the UK Parliament announced the creation of Ofcom. The new body, which was to replace several existing authorities, was conceived as a "super-regulator" to oversee media channels that were rapidly converging through digital transmission.

On , Ofcom launched, formally inheriting the duties that had previously been the responsibility of five different regulators:

the Broadcasting Standards Commission
the Independent Television Commission
the Office of Telecommunications (Oftel)
the Radio Authority
the Radiocommunications Agency

In July 2009, Conservative Party opposition leader David Cameron referenced Ofcom in a speech against the proliferation of quangos: 

Under Cameron's subsequent premiership of the 2010 UK coalition government, the Public Bodies Act 2011 did remove or modify several of Ofcom's duties, although it did not substantially reduce Ofcom's remit.

On 1 October 2011, Ofcom took over responsibility for regulating the postal services industry from the Postal Services Commission (Postcomm).

In April 2015, Ofcom announced that telephone companies would have to provide customers with a set charge for the cost of calling numbers starting with 084, 087 and 09. The streamlining of these charges must be printed in each customer's contract and monthly bills. The change came into force on 1 July 2015 and affected over 175 million phone numbers, making it the biggest overhaul of telephoning in over a decade.

On 1 January 2016, the regulation of video on demand was transferred to Ofcom from ATVOD, the Authority for Television on Demand.

The Digital Economy Act 2017 extended Ofcom's remit and powers. Ofcom were given powers concerning the minimum broadband speed provided by Internet service providers, the ability to financially penalise communications providers for failing to comply with licence commitments and the power to require public service broadcasters to include a minimum quantity of children's programming made in the United Kingdom. The act also transferred to Ofcom the regulation of the BBC, a duty previously undertaken by the BBC Trust, and updated the Ofcom Electronic Communications Code to make it easier for telecommunications companies to erect and extend mobile masts.

Following a consultation over the Online Harms White Paper published by the UK government in April 2019, the government announced in February 2020 that it intended Ofcom to have a greater role in Internet regulation to protect users from "harmful and illegal content".

In July 2022, Ofcom received additional tools to prevent, identify and remove any content that depicts child sexual abuse and exploitation. These tools will be introduced through an amendment to the Online Safety Bill. Ofcom will be allowed to penalise those tech firms that do not comply, either by fines up to £18m or by 10% of the company's annual turnover, whichever amount is higher.

News International phone hacking scandal

In July 2011, in the wake of the News International phone hacking scandal, Ofcom came under pressure to launch an inquiry into whether the parent company of News International, News Corporation, was still the "fit and proper" owner of a controlling stake in the satellite broadcasting company British Sky Broadcasting (BSkyB). On 13 July former Prime Minister Gordon Brown urged Ofcom to launch an investigation. On 15 July the Deputy Prime Minister Nick Clegg stated that the Government would launch a review of laws on what constituted a "fit and proper" owner for broadcasting companies in the United Kingdom, and that anyone found not to meet that standard can be forced to give up their current holdings in a company.

On 22 July 2011, it was reported that Ofcom had begun an investigation into whether the phone-hacking scandal may have changed BSkyB's status as the "fit and proper" holder of a UK broadcasting licence. On the same day Ed Richards, the then chief executive of Ofcom, replied to Simon Hughes MP, Don Foster MP and Tim Farron MP following a letter which they had written to him on 8 July concerning News Corporation's shareholding in BSkyB. In the letter Richards confirmed that Ofcom considers that News Corporation's current shareholding of 39.14% in BSkyB does give it a material influence over the company; that Ofcom is not precluded from acting by ongoing police investigations; and that Ofcom's process is not dependent upon a criminal conviction being secured.

In April 2012, Ofcom's probe moved from a monitoring phase to an "evidence gathering" phase.

Timeline of communications regulators

* Ministry of Posts and Telecommunications

Activities

Television and radio

Ofcom licenses all UK commercial television and radio services in the UK. Broadcasters must comply by the terms of their licence, or risk having it revoked. Ofcom also publishes the Broadcasting Code, a series of rules which all broadcast content on television and radio must follow. The Broadcasting Code requires that content inappropriate for children should not be broadcast between the hours of 5:30a.m. and 9:00p.m. Premium-rate film services may broadcast content equivalent to a BBFC 15 certificate at any time of day provided a PIN-protected system is in place to restrict access to those authorised to view it. The broadcasting of pornography with a BBFC R18 certificate is not permitted. In 2010 Ofcom revoked the licences of four free-to-air television channels for promoting adult chat services during daytime hours and transmitting content that was too sexually explicit. The companies involved were fined £157,250. Ofcom's jurisdiction does not cover television and radio channels which are broadcast in the UK but licensed abroad. In 2012 Ofcom lodged a complaint with the Dutch media regulator regarding the content of adult chat television channels which are broadcast in the UK but licensed in the Netherlands. Based on a survey of 200 British respondents, Ofcom published in 2016 a list of about 50 words classified in four grades of offensiveness, from "milder" to "strongest."

Telephone and broadband 

Ofcom regulates the UK telecoms sector, defining and enforcing the conditions by which all mobile and fixed-line phone and broadband companies must abide. These 'general conditions' are wide-ranging rules relating to matters such as telephone numbering, emergency services, sales, marketing and interconnection standards. Ofcom's investigation unit monitors compliance with the conditions and resolves disputes between providers.

Ofcom is also the competition authority for telecoms, enforcing remedies in markets where it believes dominant operators may have a potentially harmful influence on competition or consumers. One of its most high-profile interventions was to require BT to split its wholesale and retail arms into separate companies, bringing about the creation of Openreach which supplies wholesale services to both BT Retail and competing providers.

On 1 July 2015, Ofcom made a number of changes to the way phone calls to UK service numbers would be charged. Under the new legislation, which was promoted by an information campaign entitled UK Calling, call charges must be clearly stated on all materials that advertise a service number. The changes came after research found that callers are often confused about service call charges, and thus can avoid calling these numbers. The July 2015 changes also saw 'freephone numbers' 0800 and 0808 become free to call from both mobiles and landlines.

In March 2016, Ofcom launched an interactive "Mobile coverage and fixed broadband checker", allowing people to check mobile coverage and broadband speeds via their post code.

Spectrum licensing and protection

Ofcom is responsible for the management, regulation, assignment and licensing of the electromagnetic spectrum in the UK, and licenses portions of it for use in television and radio broadcasts, mobile phone transmissions, private communications networks, wireless devices and so on.  The process of licensing varies depending on the type of use required.  Some licences simply have to be applied and paid for; other commercial licences are subject to a bidding process.  Most of the procedures in place have been inherited from the systems used by the previous regulators. However, Ofcom may change some of these processes in future.

Ofcom protects the radio spectrum in a number of ways:

 Working within international organisations (ITU, CEPT and BEREC).
 Licensing UK-controlled commercial radio spectrum; the Ministry of Defence controls its own spectrum.  Within the international framework for frequency use; Ofcom liaises through the UK Government to produce the UKFAT (UK Frequency Allocation Table). The current table was produced in 2017.
 Investigate and, when necessary, carry out enforcement activities to clear interference or illegal use from the spectrum.  Until June 2010 Ofcom investigated all interference cases within the UK.  Interference reporting has now been transferred to the BBC.  This contract specifically excludes any requirement to investigate interference relating to AM radio reception. Commercial and spectrum licence holders report to Ofcom and in all cases illegal ("pirate") radio operations are still reported to Ofcom.

Postal services
In October 2010 the government announced plans for Ofcom to inherit the functions of Postcomm as part of a wider set of public service sell-off measures. Following the Postal Services Act 2011 regulatory responsibility for postal services transferred to Ofcom on 1 October 2011, with its primary duty to maintain the UK's six-day-a-week universal postal service.

Consultations

Ofcom makes extensive use of consultations with industry and the public to help it make decisions based upon the evidence presented. Consultation processes begin with publishing documents on its website, asking for views and responses. If the document is perceived to be long and complicated, a plain English summary is usually published as well. A period, usually of 10 weeks, is allowed for interested persons, companies or organisations to send in their responses to the consultation.

After this consultation period, Ofcom publishes all the responses on its website, excluding any personal or confidential information. Ofcom then prepares a summary of the responses received, and uses this information as a basis for its decisions.

Leadership

Current
Michael Grade, Baron Grade of Yarmouth was appointed as chairman of Ofcom for a four-year term from 1 May 2022.

The current Chief Executive is Melanie Dawes who was appointed on 12 February 2020.

Historical
The first chairman of Ofcom (2002–2009) was David Currie, Dean of Cass Business School at City University and a life peer under the title Lord Currie of Marylebone. The first chief executive (2003–2007) was Stephen Carter, Baron Carter of Barnes, formerly a senior executive of JWT UK and NTL and subsequently a Minister for Communications, Technology and Broadcasting.

Colette Bowe was appointed Ofcom chairman with effect from 11 March 2009. She was the founding chairman of the Telecoms Ombudsman Council, and chaired Ofcom's Consumer Panel from its inception in 2003 to December 2007.

Dame Patricia Hodgson DBE was appointed as chairman of Ofcom for a three-year term from April 2014.  She was a member of the Ofcom board from July 2011 and became deputy chairman in January 2012. On 18 July 2016, it was announced that her term would be extended for a further year until 2018.

Sharon White was Ofcom's chief executive from 2015 to 2019, having replaced Ed Richards in the role.

After Sharon White was appointed the Chief Executive of John Lewis in June 2019, the office of Chief Executive remained open until Jonathan Oxley was appointed as Interim Chief Executive. In February 2020, it was announced that Melanie Dawes would become the new Chief Executive.

On 15 March 2016, it was announced that Steve Gettings would become Corporation Secretary in succession to Graham Howell.

Key personnel
Ofcom's key personnel are:
 Chief Executive, Melanie Dawes, appointed February 2020
 Board members:
 Maggie Carver, Deputy Chair, appointed September 2018
 Jonathan Oxley, appointed January 2015
 Graham Mather, appointed June 2014
 Ben Verwaayen, appointed January 2016
 Tim Suter, appointed September 2017
 Bob Downes, appointed February 2018
 Angela Dean, appointed September 2018
David Jones, appointed April 2019

Ofcom publishes a register of disclosable interests of the Ofcom board.

Chairman of Ofcom
Status

Chief Executive Officer of Ofcom
29 December 2003 – 31 July 2006 Stephen Carter
1 August 2006 – 5 October 2006 Chairman of Ofcom (Acting)
5 October 2006 – 31 December 2014 Ed Richards
1 January 2015 – 23 March 2015 Steve Unger (Acting)
23 March 2015 – 27 November 2019 Sharon White
27 November 2019 – March 2020 Jonathan Oxley (Acting)
March 2020 – present Melanie Dawes

Ofcom committees
Ofcom has a number of committees and advisory bodies which inform the Ofcom Board and Executive. These include:
 Communications Consumer Panel (CCP)
 Advisory Committee for Older and Disabled People (ACOD)
 Risk and Audit Committee
 Nominations Committee
 Remuneration Committee
 Election Committee
 Non-Executive Remuneration Committee
 Nations Committee
 Advisory Committee for England
 Advisory Committee for Northern Ireland
 Advisory Committee for Scotland
 Advisory Committee for Wales
 Community Radio Fund Panel
 Ofcom Spectrum Advisory Board (OSAB)
 Broadcast Licensing Committee

UK hate speech regulation
Since 1 January 2021, Ofcom has defined hate speech as "all forms of expression which spread, incite, promote or justify hatred based on intolerance on the grounds of disability, ethnicity, social origin, sex, gender, gender reassignment, nationality, race, religion or belief, sexual orientation, colour, genetic features, language, political or any other opinion, membership of a national minority, property, birth or age." However, there is concern that Ofcom's broad definition of hate speech can easily result in the unjustified censorship of controversial opinions, however legitimate they might be.

Controversies

Expenditure 
Ofcom has received criticism for incurring unnecessary costs as a result of "extravagant Thames-side offices" and a "top-heavy salary bill", for inflexibility in its regulation of commercial radio, and for "poor service". In response to ongoing expenditure concerns, Ofcom made the following statement regarding the 2017/2018 budget: "Ofcom has delivered 12 consecutive years of like-for-like real-terms budget reductions, and we will continue to reduce spending wherever we can."

Al Jazeera 
The Qatar-based news media outlet was reported to Ofcom in January 2017, following an exposé about Israeli diplomatic corps irregularities and influence peddling amongst political and student groups in the UK.
After investigations exceeding eight months, Ofcom reported that Al Jazeera was in line with journalism standards and cleared the filmmakers of the allegations.

Press TV 
In May 2011, Ofcom ruled that Press TV, an Iranian English-language satellite channel, was responsible for a serious breach of UK broadcasting rules and could face a fine for airing an interview with Maziar Bahari, the Newsweek journalist arrested covering the Iranian presidential election in 2009, that was obtained by force while he was held in a Tehran jail. Press TV said that Bahari did not "dispute the truth and accuracy" of the extract of the interview, so it made "no logical sense" to require his consent.

Sitefinder database and freedom of information
The Sitefinder database is a national database of mobile phone base stations in the UK. In September 2007, an Information Tribunal ruled that the public should have access to the database under the Freedom of Information Act 2000. However, as Ofcom has no legal power to force mobile phone operators to add information to the database, UK mobile phone operators consequently ceased updating it.
Ofcom appealed against the Freedom of Information Act ruling, together with one UK mobile operator – T-Mobile. This has led to accusations of the organisation's complicity with the mobile telecommunications industry in keeping information about mast locations secret. Ofcom's stated reasons for the appeal have ranged from "preventing terrorist attacks" on the sites of phone masts to "protecting the intellectual property" of the mobile telecommunications industry.

In April 2008, the High Court found in favour of the Information Commissioner's Office and over-ruled Ofcom's objections. Ofcom appealed to the Supreme Court, who in turn referred a point of law to the European Court of Justice, and then in October 2011 ordered that the matter should be remitted to the Information Rights Tribunal to reconsider the public interest balancing exercise. On 12 December 2012, the Information Rights Tribunal upheld its decision of 4 September 2007.

Deryn Consulting controversy
In 2017, Ofcom’s advisory committee for Wales awarded Deryn Consulting a contract to monitor the National Assembly for Wales and Welsh Government. It was subsequently reported that the contract had not been put out to tender and that Huw Roberts and Nerys Evans held positions for both Deryn and Ofcom. The contract was terminated and Ofcom concluded that it had broken its own procurement rules.

Abu Dhabi TV
Abu Dhabi TV, owned by the Abu Dhabi Media state enterprise, was condemned by Ofcom for broadcasting a televised interview of the confessions made by a Qatari citizen, Dr. Mahmoud Al-Jaida, while he was detained arbitrarily in the Abu Dhabi prisons in 2013. The National Human Rights Committee of the State of Qatar welcomed Ofcom's decision. Under the decision, it was stated that on 28 June 2017, the Abu Dhabi TV channel, which is affiliated with Abu Dhabi Media Company P.J.S.C “ADMC”, licensed under Ofcom had broadcast an interview recording titled “Mahmoud Al-Jaidah and the clandestine organization in UAE”. According to the decision, the aired interview was recorded against the consent of Dr. Al-Jaidah, who was physically tortured during his time in the Abu Dhabi prison. The activity had constituted a serious breach of the principles of fairness and privacy detailed in the Ofcom Broadcasting Code.

CGTN 
In 2019, Ofcom began an investigation into the Chinese international channel CGTN, owned by state broadcaster China Central Television (CCTV), following allegations that a forced confession from British former journalist Peter Humphrey was broadcast on the channel. In addition, it also received four formal complaints over similar alleged confessions. In November, Hong Kong activist and former UK consulate worker Simon Cheng filed a complaint to Ofcom a week after CGTN released a video of him admitting to "soliciting prostitution", which Cheng said he was forced to make.

In early 2021, Ofcom revoked the UK broadcasting licence of CGTN. In a statement, it noted that the licence holder for the channel, Star China Media Ltd., did not have editorial responsibility over the channel, which was against legal requirements. It was also unable to hand over the licence to a corporation called "China Global Television Network Corporation" (CGTNC), on the grounds that the company was "ultimately controlled by the Chinese Communist Party, which is not permitted under UK broadcasting law". Ofcom later fined CGTN £225,000 for "breaching rules on fairness, privacy and due impartiality".

Following the revocation, both the Chinese government and state media began targeting the BBC, accusing it of producing "fake news" in its coverage of the COVID-19 pandemic in mainland China and the Xinjiang internment camps. CGTN itself claimed that Ofcom was "manipulated by extreme right-wing organizations and anti-China forces".

Criticism of Michael Grade 
In June 2022, the BBC's historian, Jean Seaton, publicy said that Michael Grade "is too lazy, too old, and has too many conflicts of interest," according to The Guardian. She called his appointment as chairman a means of "bullying" the BBC.

See also
Overton window
Advertising Standards Authority
Annan Committee, that in 1977 recommended the establishment of a Broadcasting Complaints Commission
Broadband stakeholder group
Office of Fair Trading
Press Complaints Commission
ATVOD
ITSPA
ISPA
Commonwealth Telecommunications Organisation (CTO)
International Telecommunication Union
List of telecommunications regulatory bodies
Roskomnadzor

References

External links
 Ofcom website
 Ofcom Broadcast Codes
 Quick video guide to Ofcom for broadcast journalists

Radio in the United Kingdom
Television in the United Kingdom
Communications authorities
Communications in the United Kingdom
Mass media complaints authorities
Postal system of the United Kingdom
Statutory corporations of the United Kingdom government
Department for Digital, Culture, Media and Sport
Government agencies established in 2003
Organisations based in the London Borough of Southwark
2003 establishments in the United Kingdom
Regulators of the United Kingdom
Telecommunications in the United Kingdom
Telecommunications regulatory authorities
Consumer organisations in the United Kingdom